Gurney Peak can refer to

 Gurney Peak (Alaska), a peak in the Alaska Range
 Gurney Peak (Wyoming), a peak in the Wind River Range of Wyoming